Lyric may refer to:

 Lyrics, the words, often in verse form, which are sung, usually to a melody, and constitute the semantic content of a song
 Lyric poetry is a form of poetry that expresses a subjective, personal point of view
 Lyric, from the Greek language, a song that is played with a lyre
 Lyric describes, in the classification of the human voice in European classical music, a specific vocal weight and a range at the upper end of the given voice part
 RTÉ lyric fm, a radio station in Ireland
 Lyric (group), a rhythm and blues girl group
 "Lyric" (song), a single released in June 2003 by Zwan
 Lyric Hearing, an extended wear hearing aid
 The Lyric (magazine), a North American poetry magazine
 The Lyric (album), a 2005 jazz album by Jim Tomlinson and Stacey Kent

See also
Lyric Opera (disambiguation)
Lyric Theatre (disambiguation)
LYRIQ (disambiguation)